Protochauliodes is a genus of fishflies in the family Corydalidae. There are about 13 described species in Protochauliodes.

Species
These 13 species belong to the genus Protochauliodes:

 Protochauliodes aridus Maddux, 1954
 Protochauliodes biconicus Kimmins, 1954
 Protochauliodes bullocki Flint, 1973
 Protochauliodes cascadius Evans, 1984
 Protochauliodes cinerascens (Blanchard, 1851)
 Protochauliodes dubitatus (Walker, 1853)
 Protochauliodes eungella Theischinger, 1988
 Protochauliodes humeralis (Banks, 1908)
 Protochauliodes kirramae Theischinger, 1983
 Protochauliodes minimus (Davis, 1903)
 Protochauliodes montivagus Chandler, 1954
 Protochauliodes simplus Chandler, 1954
 Protochauliodes spenceri Munroe, 1951

References

Further reading

 

Corydalidae
Articles created by Qbugbot